Euromissile was a European consortium set up in the 1970s by DaimlerChrysler Aerospace AG of Germany and Aérospatiale of France to produce the Euromissile HOT anti-tank missile.

Later on Aérospatiale-Matra, DaimlerChrysler Aerospace AG (DASA) (as well as Construcciones Aeronáuticas SA (CASA)) merged on 10 July 2000 and formed European Aeronautic Defence and Space Company NV (EADS) today known as Airbus. All activities regarding missiles in the former companies are now part of MBDA, where Airbus owns 37,5 %.

Missiles
HOT (missile)
MILAN
Roland (missile)

References

Defence companies of France
Defence companies of Germany
Guided missile manufacturers
Aerospatiale-Matra
France–Germany military relations
Joint ventures